In philosophical ethics, the naturalistic fallacy is the claim that any reductive explanation of good, in terms of natural properties such as pleasant or desirable, is false. The term was introduced by British philosopher G. E. Moore in his 1903 book Principia Ethica.

Moore's naturalistic fallacy is closely related to the is–ought problem, which comes from David Hume's A Treatise of Human Nature (1738–40). However, unlike Hume's view of the is–ought problem, Moore (and other proponents of ethical non-naturalism) did not consider the naturalistic fallacy to be at odds with moral realism.

The naturalistic fallacy should not be confused with the appeal to nature, which is exemplified by forms of reasoning such as "Something is natural; therefore, it is morally acceptable" or "This property is unnatural; therefore, this property is undesirable." Such inferences are common in discussions of medicine, sexuality, environmentalism, gender roles, race, and carnism.

Different common uses

The is–ought problem

The term naturalistic fallacy is sometimes used to describe the deduction of an ought from an is (the is–ought problem).  This usually takes the form of saying that If people do something (e.g., eat three times a day, smoke cigarettes, dress warmly in cold weather), then people ought to do that thing.  It becomes a naturalistic fallacy when the is–ought problem ("People eat three times a day, so it is morally good for people to eat three times a day") is justified by claiming that whatever practice exists is a natural one ("because eating three times a day is pleasant and desirable").

In using his categorical imperative, Kant deduced that experience was necessary for its application. But experience on its own or the imperative on its own could not possibly identify an act as being moral or immoral. We can have no certain knowledge of morality from them, being incapable of deducing how things ought to be from the fact that they happen to be arranged in a particular manner in experience.

Bentham, in discussing the relations of law and morality, found that when people discuss problems and issues they talk about how they wish it would be, instead of how it actually is. This can be seen in discussions of natural law and positive law. Bentham criticized natural law theory because in his view it was a naturalistic fallacy, claiming that it described how things ought to be instead of how things are.

Moore's discussion

According to G. E. Moore's Principia Ethica, when philosophers try to define good reductively, in terms of natural properties like pleasant or desirable, they are committing the naturalistic fallacy.

In defense of ethical non-naturalism, Moore's argument is concerned with the semantic and metaphysical underpinnings of ethics. In general, opponents of ethical naturalism reject ethical conclusions drawn from natural facts.

Moore argues that good, in the sense of intrinsic value, is simply ineffable: it cannot be defined because it is not a natural property, being "one of those innumerable objects of thought which are themselves incapable of definition, because they are the ultimate terms by reference to which whatever 'is' capable of definition must be defined". On the other hand, ethical naturalists eschew such principles in favor of a more empirically accessible analysis of what it means to be good: for example, in terms of pleasure in the context of hedonism.

In §7, Moore argues that a property is either a complex of simple properties, or else it is irreducibly simple. Complex properties can be defined in terms of their constituent parts but a simple property has no parts. In addition to good and pleasure, Moore suggests that colour qualia are undefined: if one wants to understand yellow, one must see examples of it. It will do no good to read the dictionary and learn that yellow names the colour of egg yolks and ripe lemons, or that yellow names the primary colour between green and orange on the spectrum, or that the perception of yellow is stimulated by electromagnetic radiation with a wavelength of between 570 and 590 nanometers, because yellow is all that and more, by the open question argument.

Bernard Williams called Moore's use of the term naturalistic fallacy, a "spectacular misnomer", the question being metaphysical, as opposed to rational.

Appeal to nature

Some people use the phrase, naturalistic fallacy or appeal to nature, in a different sense, to characterize inferences of the form "Something is natural; therefore, it is morally acceptable" or "This property is unnatural; therefore, this property is undesirable." Such inferences are common in discussions of medicine, homosexuality, environmentalism, and veganism.

Criticism

Some philosophers reject the naturalistic fallacy and/or suggest solutions for the proposed is–ought problem.

Bound-up functions
Ralph McInerny suggests that ought is already bound up in is, insofar as the very nature of things have ends/goals within them. For example, a clock is a device used to keep time. When one understands the function of a clock, then a standard of evaluation is implicit in the very description of the clock, i.e., because it is a clock, it ought to keep the time. Thus, if one cannot pick a good clock from a bad clock, then one does not really know what a clock is. In like manner, if one cannot determine good human action from bad, then one does not really know what the human person is.

Irrationality of anti-naturalistic fallacy
Certain uses of the naturalistic fallacy refutation (a scheme of reasoning that declares an inference invalid because it incorporates an instance of the naturalistic fallacy) have been criticized as lacking rational bases, and labelled anti-naturalistic fallacy. For instance, Alex Walter wrote:

"The naturalistic fallacy and Hume's 'law' are frequently appealed to for the purpose of drawing limits around the scope of scientific inquiry into ethics and morality. These two objections are shown to be without force."

The refutations from naturalistic fallacy defined as inferring evaluative conclusions from purely factual premises do assert, implicitly, that there is no connection between the facts and the norms (in particular, between the facts and the mental process that led to adoption of the norms).

Effects of putative necessities
The effect of beliefs about dangers on behaviors intended to protect what is considered valuable is pointed at as an example of total decoupling of ought from is being impossible. A very basic example is that if the value is that rescuing people is good, different beliefs on whether or not there is a human being in a flotsam box leads to different assessments of whether or not it is a moral imperative to salvage said box from the ocean. For wider-ranging examples, if two people share the value that preservation of a civilized humanity is good, and one believes that a certain ethnic group of humans have a population level statistical hereditary predisposition to destroy civilization while the other person does not believe that such is the case, that difference in beliefs about factual matters will make the first person conclude that persecution of said ethnic group is an excusable "necessary evil" while the second person will conclude that it is a totally unjustifiable evil. The same is also applicable to beliefs about individual differences in predispositions, not necessarily ethnic. In a similar way, two people who both think it is evil to keep people working extremely hard in extreme poverty will draw different conclusions on de facto rights (as opposed to purely semantic rights) of property owners depending on whether or not they believe that humans make up justifications for maximizing their profit, one who believes that people do concluding it necessary to persecute property owners to prevent justification of extreme poverty while the other person concludes that it would be evil to persecute property owners. Such instances are mentioned as examples of beliefs about reality having effects on ethical considerations.

Inconsistent application
Some critics of the assumption that is-ought conclusions are fallacies point at observations of people who purport to consider such conclusions as fallacies do not do so consistently. Examples mentioned are that evolutionary psychologists who gripe about "the naturalistic fallacy" do make is-ought conclusions themselves when, for instance, alleging that the notion of the blank slate would lead to totalitarian social engineering or that certain views on sexuality would lead to attempts to convert homosexuals to heterosexuals. Critics point at this as a sign that charges of the naturalistic fallacy are inconsistent rhetorical tactics rather than detection of a fallacy.

Universally normative allegations of varied harm
A criticism of the concept of the naturalistic fallacy is that while "descriptive" statements (used here in the broad sense about statements that purport to be about facts regardless of whether they are true or false, used simply as opposed to normative statements) about specific differences in effects can be inverted depending on values (such as the statement "people X are predisposed to eating babies" being normative against group X only in the context of protecting children while the statement "individual or group X is predisposed to emit greenhouse gases" is normative against individual/group X only in the context of protecting the environment), the statement "individual/group X is predisposed to harm whatever values others have" is universally normative against individual/group X. This refers to individual/group X being "descriptively" alleged to detect what other entities capable of valuing are protecting and then destroying it without individual/group X having any values of its own. For example, in the context of one philosophy advocating child protection considering eating babies the worst evil and advocating industries that emit greenhouse gases to finance a safe short term environment for children while another philosophy considers long term damage to the environment the worst evil and advocates eating babies to reduce overpopulation and with it consumption that emits greenhouse gases, such an individual/group X could be alleged to advocate both eating babies and building autonomous industries to maximize greenhouse gas emissions, making the two otherwise enemy philosophies become allies against individual/group X as a "common enemy". The principle, that of allegations of an individual or group being predisposed to adapt their harm to damage any values including combined harm of apparently opposite values inevitably making normative implications regardless of which the specific values are, is argued to extend to any other situations with any other values as well due to the allegation being of the individual or group adapting their destruction to different values. This is mentioned as an example of at least one type of "descriptive" allegation being bound to make universally normative implications, as well as the allegation not being scientifically self-correcting due to individual or group X being alleged to manipulate others to support their alleged all-destructive agenda which dismisses any scientific criticism of the allegation as "part of the agenda that destroys everything", and that the objection that some values may condemn some specific ways to persecute individual/group X is irrelevant since different values would also have various ways to do things against individuals or groups that they would consider acceptable to do. This is pointed out as a falsifying counterexample to the claim that "no descriptive statement can in itself become normative".

See also

 Appeal to nature
 Evidence-based medicine
 Appeal to novelty
 Appeal to tradition
 Definist fallacy
 Evolution of morality
 Fact–value distinction
 Meta-ethics
 Moralistic fallacy
 Philosophical naturalism
 Norm (philosophy)
 Open-question argument
 Principia Ethica
 The Right and the Good
 Value theory

Notes

References

Further reading

External links
 Principia Ethica 
 
 
 Appeal to Nature entry in The Fallacy Files

Relevance fallacies
Concepts in ethics